Yakovlevo is the name of several rural localities in Russia:
Yakovlevo, Arkhangelsk Oblast, a village in Kotlassky District of Arkhangelsk Oblast
Yakovlevo, Belgorod Oblast, an urban-type settlement in Yakovlevsky District of Belgorod Oblast